Electrical wiring in the United Kingdom is commonly understood to be an electrical installation for operation by end users within domestic, commercial, industrial, and other buildings, and also in special installations and locations, such as marinas or caravan parks. It does not normally cover the transmission or distribution of electricity to them.

Installations are distinguished by a number of criteria, such as voltage (high, low, extra low), phase (single or three-phase), nature of electrical signal (power, data), type and design of cable (conductors and insulators used, cable design, solid/fixed or stranded/flexible, intended use, protective materials), circuit design (ring, radial), and so on.

Electrical wiring is ultimately regulated to ensure safety of operation, by such as the building regulations, currently legislated as the Building Regulations 2010, which lists "controlled services" such as electric wiring that must follow specific directions and standards, and the Electricity at Work Regulations 1989. The detailed rules for end-use wiring followed for practical purposes are those of BS 7671 Requirements for Electrical Installations. (IET Wiring Regulations), currently in its 18th edition, which provide the detailed descriptions referred to by legislation.

UK electrical wiring standards are largely harmonised with the regulations in other European countries and the international IEC 60446 standard. However, there are a number of specific national practices, habits and traditions that differ significantly from other countries, and which in some cases survived harmonisation. These include the use of ring circuits for domestic and light commercial fixed wiring, fused plugs, and for circuits installed prior to harmonisation, historically unique wiring colours.

Common terminology

Regulatory 
BS 7671 "Requirements for Electrical Installations. IET Wiring Regulations" (the regs, or wiring regs) these are detailed rules for the design, installation and sign-off for end-user electrical installations.  Compliance with BS 7671 is not mandatory, but official guidance states following BS 7671 is one way to demonstrate  compliance with the building regulations.  
Building regulations - "Part P" Section of the Building Regulations for England and Wales addressing electrical wiring and safety in residential situations and outbuildings.
Local authority building control (LABC; building control) Local council department responsible for overseeing and administering building regulations.
Competent person scheme Private organizations authorised by the state to supervise, accredit, and control the registration of installers. In the case of domestic installations such schemes operate Notification of works to LABC.
Electrical installation condition report (EICR, ICR); previously the periodic inspection report (PIR) Formal report/certification of the condition of a wiring installation.
Permit to workFormal confirmation that electrical wiring is isolated and fully made safe, prior to working on it, required prior to any high voltage works and other high risk activities.
Skilled Person (electrically) (formally "Competent Person") defined by BS 7671 as "Person who possesses, as appropriate to the nature of the electrical work to be undertaken, adequate education, training and practical skills, and who is able to perceive risks and avoid hazards which electricity can create". The Electricity at Work Regulations requires persons to be competent to prevent danger and injury.

Distribution within premises 
Consumer unit, consumer control unit, or consumer distribution unit (CU, CDU, CCU; historically and commonly, fuse board/box) Distribution board designed for ordinary low voltage single phase premises, primarily domestic and light commercial wiring. 3-phase power distribution boards are usually known as distribution boards.
Distribution board (DB) Panel that splits power from one main source into separate circuits, each with independent protection.

Breakers and safety devices 
Breaker (circuit breaker, CB) Any fixed device that breaks a circuit (that is, while it is drawing current) upon fault condition detection.
Miniature circuit breaker (MCB) An overcurrent-protection circuit breaker with standardised current ratings and tripping characteristics, which can be installed in close proximity in consumer units and distribution boards.
Residual current device (RCD), also residual current circuit breaker (RCCB) A circuit breaker triggered by unequal currents in live and neutral wires (i.e., electrical power is passing to earth). Mandatory for most circuits as of 17th Edition regulations.
Residual current circuit breaker with overcurrent protection (RCBO) Combination of RCD and MCB; breaks circuit on being triggered either as an RCD or by overcurrent.
Earth leakage circuit breaker (ELCB) An obsolete circuit breaker type triggered by electrical power in a fault wire connected only to specifically protected parts in the circuit and appliances (i.e., other paths to earth exist).

Wires and cables 
Line (L; formerly, live, or phase) Power-carrying core/wire in a typical low-voltage or domestic installation; colour-coded  brown (pre-2004: red).
Neutral (N) Power-carrying core/wire in a typical low-voltage or domestic installation, usually bonded to earth (ground) voltage by the supplier; colour-coded  blue (pre-2004: black).
Earth (E), formally, circuit protective conductor (CPC)Core/wire that provides a connection to earth, for safety and protection purposes, for both end-user devices and metal objects and components in the installation; colour-coded  green/yellow striped (may be bare within sheathed cable)(pre-2004: also green/yellow striped, but pre-1976: solid green).
Steel-wire armoured Steel wire protected cable, mandatory for outdoor or buried use unless equivalent protection provided via trunking.
Trunking Protective conduit, typically made of plastic or metal, used to protect and hold cables, and allow access and maintenance, as they pass through the installation premises.
Meter tails (or, tails)Separated core cables used to connect the incoming power supply to a premises with the distribution board. Typically in a domestic environment, connects the electricity meter (which is owned by the supplier and treated as the incoming source) to the consumer unit.
Twin/2, 3 or 4 core and earth Flat cable, usually insulated by a polyvinyl chloride sheath, used for fixed wiring. The name comes from the fact that it contains line and neutral conductor cores with individual insulations (twinned), and an uninsulated earth core.  3- and 4- core are identical but contain further conducting cores, each individually insulated. This type of flat cable is a type of cable which is used in houses (although out of sight) and has a standard colour of grey and it supplies sockets, lighting and appliances etc.

Voltage and phases 
Low voltage Where the peak voltage does not exceed 600 volts. In practice this means DC supplies that do not exceed 600 volts and AC supplies that do not exceed 425 volts. Almost all domestic; light commercial (e.g., offices) and industrial (for three phase machinery) power is low voltage for regulation purposes.
High voltageAny voltage in excess of low voltage; usually found in industrial processes and electricity transmission and distribution networks.
Extra-low voltage (ELV) 50 V AC or 120 V ripple-free DC, or less.
Separated extra-low voltage (SELV) Extra-low voltage system that is also electrically isolated.
Single phase, 3 phaseAt low voltage electricity may be supplied by the distributor (DNO) as either single or 3 phase. A single phase supply will comprise a single live conductor and a neutral conductor. A 3 phase supply will comprise three live conductors each pair with a phase separation of 120 degrees and (optionally) a neutral conductor. A separate earth conductor will normally be supplied in both cases but may not be present depending on the connection type.

Earthing (bonding) 
Bonding (including main bonding, supplementary bonding and equipotential bonding) Connection made to earth, for protective purposes, either for individual components, for other metal objects in the premises (such as gas, water, or oil piping), or for the installation (or some part of it) as a whole.
Earth/ground rod A long rod placed into the ground, bonding, with low impedance, the installation to earth potential. Usually made from copper-clad, galvanised or stainless steel or copper, for corrosion prevention. There are other types of earth bond, such as: earth plate, earth mesh, or earth ring.

Circuit terminology 
Circuit Means used to connect a distribution board or consumer unit to devices that will receive power from it (typically cable and accessory components).
Final circuit Circuit that supplies electricity to end-user devices (lighting, heating, sockets, appliances, etc.).
Radial and loop A circuit where each load is supplied by a single cable; i.e., the cables branch, or radiate, outwards from a single supply point. Loop wiring is radial wiring in lighting circuits where junctions are made at ceiling roses with line and switched line wires.
Ring, or ring final circuit (RFC) A ring circuit is a UK standard means for wiring domestic and other light commercial premises, not often seen elsewhere in the world; in effect it is a radial circuit whose final termination is made back to the originating distribution board, rather than at the last outlet or device serviced.
De-energized circuit Circuit that is isolated from power and not at a potential different from earth. Note the difference to permit to work.
Spur A branch supplying a side-socket or outlet, especially from a ring circuit.

Wiring colours

Conductor colours
The standard wiring colours in the UK are  the same as elsewhere in Europe and follow international standard IEC 60446. This colour scheme had already been introduced for appliance flexes in the UK in the early 1970s, however the original red/black colour scheme recommended by the IEE for fixed wiring was retained until 2006, albeit with change to a green/yellow striped earth in 1976. As a result, the international standard blue/brown scheme is as of 2006 found in most appliance flexes. In fixed wiring, the blue/brown scheme is only found in newer (post-2004) installations, and the old IEE red/black scheme is likely to be encountered in existing installations for many more decades.

The standard colours in fixed wiring were harmonised in 2004 with the regulations in other European countries and the international IEC 60446 standard. For a transitional period (April 2004 – March 2006) either set of colours were allowed (but not both), provided that any changes in the colour scheme are clearly labelled. From April 2006, only the new colours should be used for any new wiring.

Potential for confusion
The UK changed colour codes three decades after most other European countries, as in 1977 the change of neutral and phase colours was not considered safe by the IEE. Blue, previously used as a phase colour, is now the colour for neutral. Black, which was previously used for neutral, now indicates a phase.

Household wiring does not usually use three-phase supplies and the clash only occurs in three-phase systems.  Wiring to the old standard can be detected by use of a red wire. The new standard colour code does not use red. Where new wiring is mixed with old, cables must be clearly marked to prevent interchange of phase and neutral.

Variation in the earth/ground conductor's colour at an earlier date that the remainder of the colours means its colour should not be used as an indication of the old vs new standard cable or colour assignment.

Other colour schemes
On telecommunications nominal 48 V DC supplies, the live is usually −42 V (flat batteries) to almost −57 V (float charge).

The IEC currently specifies a colour-coding for new local DC distribution. These are:

There is a long history of colour changes; prior to 1964 white was used instead of yellow as the second phase, and before World War II, a black earth and a green third phase in place of green earth and white phase was permitted. The regulations permitted (and still do) the use of any wire colour that is not an earth colour, providing it is unambiguously identified at all connections by clear labelling or by correctly coloured over-sleeving. It was not uncommon on commercial builds of the 1960s with a three phase supply for the phase colours (red, yellow, blue) to be used throughout single phase sub circuits thus indicating the phase origin of the supply, in this case no over-sleeving was used and can give rise to confusion when encountered today.

Direct current mains supplies are only of historical interest in the UK but the colour coding was red for live and black for earthed (regardless of the polarity).  Hardly any loads were polarity sensitive when direct current systems were introduced (principally incandescent lighting, heating systems or series direct current motors) and it was considered more important to identify the live wire than the polarity.  In later years of direct current supplies, however, much more equipment became sensitive to polarity, such as many domestic radios & television sets.  Where all three wires were available, the historical colour code was red (positive), black (middle) and white (negative).  The negative line changed to yellow in 1964, and then to blue in 1966.

Outer sheath colours

The colour of the outer sheath is currently grey, or white for low halogen material.  Previously cables from different manufacturers were available variously in grey or white, with no significance attached to the sheath colour. The grey colour was adopted by cable manufacturers to match older lead or silver sheathed flat cables, with some manufacturers using a silver grey polyvinyl chloride. Additionally twin & earth cable was available in red for fire alarms until the early 2000s.

Circuit design

UK fixed wiring circuits, unlike those found in almost all other countries, make widespread use of ring circuit designs, as well as radial circuit designs often seen in other countries. (This was one of the recommendations of the Electrical Installations Committee, convened in 1942 as part of the Post War Building Studies programme, which in 1944 determined that the ring final circuit offered a more efficient and lower cost method to support a greater number of sockets.) It continues to be the usual wiring method for domestic and light commercial socket and device wiring in the UK. Lighting circuits, which typically have lower power requirements, are usually radially wired, confusingly sometimes called "loop" wiring.

In both ring and radial circuits, the circuit wiring starts at a consumer unit or distribution board, and traverses in turn a number of sockets or devices (point-to-point style), before terminating. The difference is that a radial circuit simply ends upon reaching the last connected device in any branch, whereas in a ring circuit the termination is made by joining the end of the circuit from the last device back to its starting point. A ring circuit therefore forms a continuous ring, while a radial may be a simple linear chain, though it may split and have several branches. This means that in a ring there are two independent paths from the supply to every device.  Ideally, the ring acts like two radial circuits proceeding in opposite directions around the ring, the dividing point between them dependent on the distribution of load in the ring. If the load is evenly split across the two directions, the current in each direction is half of the total, allowing the use of wire with half the current-carrying capacity. In practice, it is impossible to ensure the load does split evenly, so regulations require a thicker wire, of at least 2/3 the current capacity of the fuse or circuit breaker.

The innovation that made ring circuits feasible in the UK was the introduction of plugs that contained their own fuse.  There were three competing designs but only one ultimately survived and became the version specified in British Standard 1363. BS1363 plugs, could historically be fitted with a range of fuses up to 13A though only the 3A and 13A are the official choices, though 5A are available and often fitted to small appliances that take a large inrush current.  This means that every load plugged in is covered by an appropriate protective device in its plug, so that the whole ring may then be protected by (usually) a 32A breaker at the distribution panel.  In contrast, circuits feeding any other kind of socket outlet need to be protected by a breaker that will not allow the socket's rating to be exceeded, and so the radial circuits generally used with outlets such as the European Schuko style outlets generally have to be protected by a 16A breaker at the distribution panel;  this limits the total load on the circuit and hence such circuits tend to have fewer socket outlets.

Cables are most commonly a single outer sheath containing separately-insulated  and neutral wires, and a non-insulated protective earth to which sleeving is added when exposed. Such cable is commonly referred to as twin and earth or simply T & E. Standard sizes have a conductor cross sectional area of 1, 1.5, 2.5, 4, 6 and 10 mm2. With most domestic wiring using:

The earthing conductor is uninsulated since it is not intended to have any voltage difference from surrounding earthed articles.

Earthing and bonding

Earthing and bonding are used together to provide shock protection by avoiding a dangerous combination of magnitude and duration of the voltage to which people may be exposed in the event of a fault within the installation or outside the installation.  (Exposure may be from e.g. hand to hand or hand to foot, between simultaneously accessible conductive surfaces, which might include the earth itself, mildly conductive floors and walls, metal taps, pipes, electrical appliances etc. 
Examples of faults are an insulation failure between a line conductor and a metallic frame of an appliance within the installation, a break in a combined protective-earth and neutral conductor in the supply, or an insulation fault in the supply transformer causing the whole low-voltage system to rise in potential.)  Conductors for these protective functions of earthing and bonding are insulated with green/yellow (striped) colour coding, which is not permitted for any other conductors.

Earthing connects exposed conductive parts (ECPs) of electrical equipment to a main earthing terminal (MET), which is connected to a "means of earthing" that somehow connects it to the earth itself (the ground/soil/planet!). In installations fed from low-voltage public supplies in the UK this means of earthing can be any of the methods TN-S, TN-C-S or TT defined in BS 7671.    In the event of an insulation fault from a live conductor to an appliance's metal frame (an ECP), the frame could—if not so connected—be dangerous if touched by someone who is also for example standing outside on the ground, or standing inside on a concrete floor, or holding a tap whose pipe connects it electrically into the ground. Protective earthing limits the combination of magnitude and duration of the dangerous voltage that could exist between the ECP and the earth itself.  In conventional installations in the UK the voltage between an appliance frame and the earth itself during a zero-impedance fault has a dangerous magnitude: it might be reduced to about half of the 230 V line-earth voltage, which is well above the 50 V usually accepted as safe for an AC system, or it might be nearly 230 V in a TT system with a poor earth electrode for the installation. The duration of this voltage must therefore be limited, which is done by "automatic disconnection of supply" (ADS) either by overcurrent protection devices (OCPDs), or by residual current devices (RCDs) that specifically detect the current escaping from the intended circuit, allowing them to have a far lower tripping current.  In TT systems it is almost always necessary to have an RCD, as earth electrodes usually have many times higher resistance than a typical supply cable, so earth-fault currents are relatively low. In the TN-S or TN-C-S systems none of the "earth fault" current necessarily passes through the earth, as there is a metallic circuit for the entire earth-fault loop: adequate ADS times may often be achieved by normal OCPDs.  However, the connection to the earth itself is always relevant, since the earth forms a mildly conductive surface that we cannot easily avoid (e.g. a person standing on the ground and touching a metal appliance or tap or building-framework that is connected with the electrical installation's protective earthing system). In TT systems the installation's earth electrode needs to have low enough impedance to operate protection if a safe voltage (usually taken as 50 V) between the installation and remote earth is exceeded; in TN systems the system's neutral point needs a low resistance connection to earth to prevent a fault between a line conductor and some unintended earth electrode from displacing the neutral-point potential to a dangerous level compared to the earth.

Bonding is the connection of conductive parts together, to reduce the voltage between them. This is an important measure for electric shock protection. When this protective function is the purpose of bonding, BS 7671 describes the bonding by the term "protective equipotential bonding"; this does not mean that the bonding guarantees perfect equipotentiality, but just that it reduces the differences of potential. In the following, this formal term is abbreviated to "bonding".  Without adequate bonding, dangerous voltages could arise between conductive parts that can be touched simultaneously, either due to problems outside the installation, or to faults in the installation.

Main bonding connects "extraneous conductive parts" such as mains water / gas supply pipes, structural parts of buildings, communication cable sheaths, lightning protection systems etc., to the main earthing terminal. These parts could otherwise introduce potentials that are different from the potential of the installation's earthing system. The main bonding avoids dangerous differences in potential being introduced into the installation, between e.g. two different pipework systems, or between pipes and electrical system ECPs.

Supplementary bonding connects simultaneously touchable conductive parts in local parts of an installation: the parts may be pairs of ECPs on different circuits, or an ECP and extraneous conductive parts. This reduces the voltage between them, even in fault conditions. Supplementary bonding is particularly used in situations such as bathrooms, where body resistance is low and therefore requires magnitude and duration of touch voltages to be very limited.

In special circumstances (not domestic installations) bonding with deliberate lack of connection to earth (earth free local equipotential bonding) may be used.  Bonding, by the IEC 60364 terminology used in BS 7671, should not be seen as just an extra to earthing. In recent US practice, which differs considerably from IEC principles and terminology, "bonding" is used more widely as a term for all the aspects of earthing that are not literally connections with the earth itself ("grounding"); so the connection of protective earth conductors to the supply neutral (since the TN-C-S system is the only permitted form in their residential installations) is now named bonding rather than earthing. This is not the case in the UK.

Supply, metering and distribution

Single phase (standard for domestic and light commercial)
A domestic supply typically consists of a large cable connected to a service head, the sealed box containing the main supply fuse, treated as the supply to the premises. This will typically have a value from 40–100 A. Separate  and neutral cables (tails) go from here to an electricity meter. More tails proceed from the meter into the consumer side of the installation and into a consumer unit (distribution board), or in some cases to a Henley block (a splitter box used in low voltage electrical engineering, slang named for W.T.Henley & Co. also sometimes called an "Isco" block, both names derived from brands of these blocks) and thence to more than one distribution board.

The distribution board (a.k.a. fusebox) contains one or more main switches and an individual fuse or miniature circuit breaker (MCB) for each final circuit.  Modern installations may use residual-current devices (RCDs) or residual current breakers with overcurrent protection (RCBOs). The RCDs are used for earth leakage protection, while RCBOs combine earth leakage protection with overcurrent protection. In a UK-style board, breaker positions are numbered top to bottom in the left-hand column, then top to bottom in the right column.

Supply voltage
Since some point in the 1970s, the supply voltage in UK domestic premises has been 240 V AC (RMS) at 50 Hz. In 1988, a Europe-wide agreement was reached to unify the various national voltages, which ranged, at the time, 220–240 V, to a common European standard of 230 V (CENELEC Harmonization Document HD 472 S1:1988).

The standard nominal supply voltage in domestic single-phase 50 Hz installations in the UK is still 240 V AC (RMS), but since 1 January 1995 (Electricity Supply Regulations, SI 1994, No. 3021) this has an asymmetric voltage tolerance of  (216.2–253.0 V), which covers the same voltage range as continental 220 V supplies to the new unified 230 V standard. This was supposed to be widened to 230 V ±10% (207–253 V), but the time of this change has been put back repeatedly and as of December 2012 there is no definitive date. The old standard was 240 V ±6% (225.6–254.4 V), which is mostly contained within the new range, and so in practice suppliers have had no reason to change voltages.

Note that 240 V AC RMS means a momentary peak voltage of plus or minus 339 volts (see this explanation), occurring 50 (either positive or negative) or 100 (both, opposing) times per second.  At the tolerances mentioned above, the peak voltage could be (momentarily) larger still.

Three-phase supply

Three phase power is usually supplied as needed, for commercial and industrial premises.  While three phase loads take balanced power from the three phases, any single phase loads are distributed to ensure equal loading of the three phases. Each row of breakers in the distribution board is fed from a different phase (L1, L2, and L3), to allow 3-pole common-trip breakers to have one pole on each phase.

Isolating devices

Single-pole switches are most commonly used to control circuits. These switches isolate only the  conductor feeding the load and are used for lighting and other smaller loads. For larger loads like air conditioners, cookers, water heaters and other fixed appliances a double-pole switch is used, which isolates also the neutral, for more safety. A three-pole isolator or circuit breaker is used for three-phase loads, for devices with both permanent and switched supplies (such as bathroom extractor fans) and also at the distribution board to isolate all the phases as well as the neutral.

Outlets and accessories

Many accessories for electrical installations (e.g., wall sockets, switches) sold in the UK are designed to fit into the mounting boxes defined in BS 4662:2006—Boxes for flush mounting of electrical accessories—Requirements, test methods and dimensions, with an 86 mm × 86 mm square face plate that is fixed to the rest of the enclosure by two M3.5 screws (typ. 25 mm or 40 mm long) located on a horizontal centre line, 60.3 mm apart. Double face plates for BS 4662 boxes measure 147 mm × 86 mm and have the two screws 120.6 mm apart.

Accessories in the BS 4662 format are only available in a comparatively limited range of designs and lack the product diversity and design sophistication found in other European markets. The UK installation-accessory industry is therefore occasionally criticised for being overly conservative. As many modern types of electrical accessories (e.g., home automation control elements from non-UK manufacturers) are not available in BS 4662 format, other standard mounting boxes are increasingly used as well, such as those defined in DIN 49073-1 (60 mm diameter, 45 mm deep, fixing screws 60 mm apart) or, less commonly in the UK, ANSI/NEMA OS-1.

The commonly used domestic wall-mount socket used in the UK for currents up to 13 A is defined in BS 1363-2 and normally includes a switch. For higher currents or three-phase supplies, IEC 60309 sockets are to be used instead.

Many high load non-UK-sourced appliances need IEC 60309 connectors (or wiring via a British Standard "20 A connection unit") in the UK because of the lower plug rating.

Plug and accessory fuses (or, cartridge fuse)
Flexible appliance cords require protection at a lower current than that provided by the ring circuit overcurrent protection device. The protection device may be contained within the appliance plug or connection unit, and is normally a ceramic cartridge fuse to BS 1362:1973, commonly rated at 3 A (red), 5 A (black), or 13 A (brown), but some accessories and adaptors use a ceramic cartridge fuse to BS 646:1958.

In the case of permanently connected equipment, a fused connection unit (FCU) to BS 1363-4 is used, this may include an isolator switch and a neon bulb to indicate if the equipment is powered.

In the case of non-permanently connected domestic equipment, a BS 1363-2 socket rated at 13 A is attached to the ring circuit, into which a fused plug may be inserted.  (Note, it is not intended that the fuse should protect the appliance itself, for which it is still necessary for the appliance designer to take the necessary precautions.)  Multiple socket accessories may be protected with a fuse within the socket assembly.

Residential wiring

Cable types
In domestic wiring, the following cable types are typically used:

Internal wiring
Twin and earth polyvinyl chloride-insulated and -sheathed cables, or
Single-core polyvinyl chloride-insulated cables in conduit (fixed internal wiring; less common in domestic installations)
Flexible cords

Supply side wiring
2-, 3-, or 4-core polyvinyl chloride-insulated, steel-wire armoured, polyvinyl chloride-sheathed cables
Polyvinyl chloride-insulated, polyvinyl chloride-sheathed (unarmoured cables)
3- and 4-core XLPE-insulated, steel-wire armoured, polyvinyl chloride-sheathed cables

Selection of conductors and circuit breakers
The selection of conductors must be made taking into consideration both the maximum voltage drop allowed at the load end and also the current carrying capacity of the conductor. Conductor size and voltage drop tables are available to determine the selection, which will be based on the load current supplied.

The choice of circuit breaker is also based on the normal rated current of the circuit. Modern circuit breakers have overload and short circuit current protection combined. The overload protection is for protection of the equipment against sustained small-to-medium increase in current above the rated current, while short circuit protection is for the protection of the conductors against high over-currents due to short circuits.

For domestic circuits the following choices are typically adopted for selecting conductor and circuit breaker sizes.

For distribution boards the incomer circuit breaker rating depends on the current demand at that board. For this the maximum demand and diversity are taken into consideration, based on which the probable current is calculated. Diversity is the condition that all appliances are not likely to be working all at the same time or at their maximum ratings. From this the maximum demand is calculated and the currents are added to determine the load current and hence the rating of the circuit breaker.

IEE recommends these current demands and diversity factors for various loads to determine the load current and rating of overcurrent protective device.

Special locations

Bathrooms
The installation of electrical devices in bathrooms and shower rooms is regulated in Section 701 of BS 7671:2018, and Part P of the Building Regulations in England and Wales. For such rooms, four special zones are defined, in which additional protection is required for electrical facilities:

Zone 0 is the smallest cuboid volume that contains the bath, shower basin, etc.
Zone 1 is the area above zone 0, up to a height of 2.25 m above the floor.
Zone 2 is the area above zone 1 up to a height of 3 m, as well as the area that is horizontally within 0.6 m from zone 1.
Older regulations defined zone 3 as the area above zone 2 up to a height of 3 m, as well as the area that is horizontally within 2.4 m from zone 2; from BS 7671:2008, this is replaced by the term outside the zones. This includes any space under the bath or shower that can only be accessed with a tool.

Within zone 0, no devices are allowed apart from suitable equipment and/or insulated pull cords. Previously, in zone 1, only separated extra-low voltage (SELV) devices were permitted. Any AC transformer supplying such a device must be located outside zones 0–2. Since the introduction of the 17th edition of the IET Wiring Regulations in 2008, 230 V fixtures such as light fittings and extractor fans are permitted in zones 1 and 2, subject to those fixtures meeting the appropriate ingress protection ratings. The minimum required ingress protection rating in zone 0 is IPX7 in zone 1 and IPX4 in zone 2. If water jets are likely to occur, at least IPX5 is required in zones 1–3. Otherwise, in zone 3 and beyond, an ingress protection rating of IP20 is the minimum required. Equipment in zones 1 and 2 must be protected by a 30 mA residual current device (RCD).

Shaving sockets (with isolating transformer) are permitted in zone 2 if direct spray from a shower is unlikely, even if they are only IP20. Before the 2008 regulations, such shaving sockets were the only sockets permitted in a bathroom or shower room. Since BS 7671:2008 normal domestic sockets are permitted, at distances greater than 3 m from the edge of the zones, providing the circuit is RCD protected. As the new regulations require all general purpose sockets not for use by skilled or instructed persons to be RCD protected, this effectively permits normal wiring in the larger bathroom. (Earlier British wiring rules in bathrooms used to be far more restrictive, leading to British peculiarities in bathrooms such as the use of cord switches. The 2011 edition of the wiring regulations is more flexible now, placing restrictions on bathroom installations that are now similar to those in other European countries.)

Swimming pools
For swimming pools, Section 603 of BS 7671 defines similar zones. In some of these zones, only industrial sockets according to IEC 60309 are permitted, in order to discourage the use of portable domestic appliances with inappropriate ingress protection rating.

Portable outdoor equipment
For use outdoors or in other wet locations (but not bathrooms) special sockets are made. These can be divided into three main groups: industrial sockets, which are totally different from the standard sockets; sockets with the same pinout as normal sockets but that will only seal properly when the correct plug and socket are used together (e.g., the 5 A, 13 A, and 15 A variants of Lewden sockets); and sockets that completely enclose a normal plug with a seal around the flex (e.g., MK Masterseal).

Sockets that are outside or can "feasibly supply equipment outside the equipotential zone" (a wording that is fairly ambiguous and the exact interpretation of which is subject to some controversy) should be protected by a 30 mA, or lower, RCD to provide additional safety. Since 2008, all sockets for general use should be RCD protected, removing the questions that used to arise, such as if a socket by the door might power a lawnmower does it need an RCD?

Construction sites
The risk of electrical shock on construction sites can be reduced by several measures, including reduction of the normal 230-volt distribution voltage to 110 volts for electrical lighting and power tools. By using a centre-tapped transformer, each conductor of the circuit is only at 55 volts with respect to earth. This reduces the chance of dangerous electrical shock when using power tools in wet locations.  Where 230 volts must be used, a residual current device (RCD) can be used to detect small leakage currents and automatically isolate faulty equipment.  In sites where hazardous flammable gases or liquids are present, special wiring rules are applied to reduce the probability of a spark igniting a fire or explosion.

Legal and regulatory

Legal basis

In England and Wales, the Building Regulations (Approved Document: Part P) require domestic electrical installations to be designed and installed safely according to the "fundamental principles" given in British Standard BS 7671 Chapter 13, most recently updated in July 2018. These are very similar to the fundamental principles defined in international standard IEC 60364-1 and equivalent national standards in other countries. Accepted ways for fulfilling this legal requirement include:

the rules of the IEE (IET) wiring regulations (BS 7671), colloquially referred to as "the regs". The current version of this standard is the 18th edition, formally known as BS 7671:2018 Requirements for Electrical Installations. IET Wiring Regulations;
the rules of an equivalent standard approved by a member of the EEA (e.g., DIN/VDE 0100);
guidance given in installation manuals that are consistent with BS 7671, such as the IET On-Site Guide and IET Guidance Notes Nos. 1 to 8.

In Scotland, the Building (Scotland) Regulations 2004 apply.

Installations in commercial and industrial premises must satisfy various safety legislation, such as the Electricity at Work Regulations 1989. Again, recognised standards and practices, such as BS 7671 "Wiring Regulations", are used to help meet the legislative requirements.

Regulations
All new electrical work in England and Wales within a domestic setting must comply with Part P of the Building Regulations first introduced on 1 January 2005, which are legally enforceable. One way of achieving this is to apply British Standard BS 7671 (the "Wiring Regulations"), including carrying out adequate inspection and testing to this standard of the completed works. British Standard BS 7671 (the "Wiring Regulations") is not statutory, thus someone doing electrical work is allowed to deviate from the wiring regulations to some degree, but it is generally accepted that it is best to follow the wiring regulations to the highest standard possible. Electrical work does not have to be compliant with BS 7671, but if a casualty or fatality occurs as a direct result of that electrical work, and this results in a legal action, then it may be necessary to justify major deviations from the principles of BS 7671 and other appropriate standards.

Some of the restrictions first introduced with the 2005 version of Part P of the Building Regulations were highly controversial, especially the rules surrounding work carried out by unregistered electricians, builders and DIYers. Under the new regulations, commencement of any work other than simple changes became notifiable to the local building control authority; "other than simple" in this context meant any work in a kitchen or bathroom other than like-for-like replacement, work in other areas more than just adding extra lights or sockets to an existing circuit, or meeting certain other criteria, such as outdoor wiring. To coincide with the new regulations, the Government approved several professional bodies to award "competent persons" status to enterprises which meet the minimum agreed criteria for Scheme entry. Scheme membership allows an enterprise to "self-certify" work that they carry out without the requirement to have undergone any formal installation training or to hold relevant qualifications in electrical installation practices - since practical competence can be assessment-based only. The minimum criteria for Scheme entry are set by the EAS  Committee, on which all of the commercial enterprises running Competent Persons Schemes are actively represented.

The local authority's building control must be informed of any notifiable work carried out by someone who is not registered under this scheme before it is started (unless it is an emergency) and must subsequently be approved by them. Originally, it was widely understood by some local authorities that inspection by a qualified person (leading to authority approval) must be organised and paid for by the home-owner or person responsible for the site and this caused some considerable criticism.

On 6 April 2006, Part P was amended to clarify the requirements around certification of DIY work (or work completed by someone otherwise unable to self-certify) and to "make enforcement more proportionate to the risk".

The 2006 amendment made it clear that it is the responsibility of the building control authority to issue the necessary certificate (a Building Regulations Completion Certificate) once work has been completed. Any inspection required to safely issue that certificate must be determined by, and paid for by, the building control authority. This can be done "in house" or they may contract the work out to a specialist body. Although any inspections are at the expense of the building authority, notification of building work is a formal process and a building control fee is payable.

In some cases the installation of 12 V downlighters is notifiable whereas the installation of 230 V mains downlighters is not. This is because 12 V downlighters draw high currents, in comparison with a mains voltage lamp with the same power rating, and that combined with the wrong choice of cable could lead to a fire.

Additionally, whilst the Building Regulations apply equally to anyone carrying out electrical work in dwellings, without appropriate knowledge and test equipment it is not possible to ensure that the work carried out is safe. Registered Scheme members must issue appropriate certification for each job.

Another element of confusion is that the term "Special Locations" has different meanings in Part P of the Building Regulations and BS 7671 (the "Wiring Regulations").

Later revisions of part P (latest is 2013) retain the requirement to work to an appropriate standard, but have relaxed the requirements on both certification and notification for many more types of minor works, and crucially also permit a member of an approved body to inspect and 'sign off' notifiable aspects of any work of a third party such as DIYer whose work is of a suitable standard. This is intended to free up local authorities, who often do not have suitably qualified building control staff themselves. Due to uncertainty about who then becomes responsible for any hidden wiring, very few electricians are happy to sign off an installation that they have not been party to from the outset, and been able to agree stages to inspect and test before any covering in.

See also
AC power plugs and sockets: British and related types (contains more detailed history of electrical wiring styles in the UK)
Electrical wiring in North America
Pattress
Technical standards in Hong Kong

References

ASEE Illustrated Guide to the IEE Wiring Regulations (15th Edition 1981), The Association of Supervisory and Executive Engineers (Not found as at March 2014)

Further reading
BS 4662:2006 Boxes for flush mounting of electrical accessories – Requirements, test methods and dimensions. British Standards Institution.

External links
IEE Wiring Regulations
Electrical Safety at Work, Health & Safety Executive
Electrical standards and approved codes of practice, Health & Safety Executive
General Cable - Imperial / Metric Conductor Size Comparison Chart
Approved Document P for guidance on Part P of the Building Regulations
Local Authority Building Control Part P Competent Persons Register

Electrical safety in the United Kingdom
Electrical wiring
Science and technology in the United Kingdom